Gasztony is a village in Vas county, Hungary.

Kálmán Széll, a Hungarian politician, the Prime Minister of Hungary between 1899 and 1903 was born here.

External links 
 Street map (Hungarian)

Populated places in Vas County